The Independent Sporting Association (ISA) is a grouping of independent schools located in New South Wales, Australia, generally within  of the Sydney central business district, that are associated for the purposes of sporting competitions.

Members of the ISA often compete with members of the Great Public Schools (GPS) and Combined Associated Schools (CAS) in  trial and representative fixtures.

Of New South Wales' 130 Rhodes Scholars from 1904 to 2006, two have attended a school that is a member of the ISA.

Current member schools

Current associate member schools

Sports
Rugby union
Soccer
Cricket
Tennis
Basketball
Hockey
Netball
Swimming
Athletics
Softball
Touch football

The Competition in some sports is split into a 1st division and a second division with the stronger schools being in the 1st Division.

See also
 List of non-government schools in New South Wales

References

External links
 official website

Australian school sports associations